Church of St. Felix may refer to:
 Church of St. Felix, Nantes, France
 Church of St. Felix, Girona, Spain
 Church of St. Felix, El Pino, Spain